Joe Branch is a stream in Hickman County, Tennessee, in the United States.

Joe Branch was named for Joe McCann, a pioneer who settled at the creek in the 1820s.

See also
List of rivers of Tennessee

References

Rivers of Hickman County, Tennessee
Rivers of Tennessee